Leele Fuli Fak or Leele Fuli Fak Njie (ruled c.1543–c.1549) was the twelfth ruler, or Burba, of the Jolof Empire. He was the last emperor. After his defeat at the Battle of Danki in 1549, the empire collapsed and Jolof became a mere kingdom. Leele Fuli was killed in that battle.

References

16th-century monarchs in Africa
Year of birth missing
1549 deaths